Hanmi may refer to:

Hanmi (Aikido), a concept related to movement in the martial art Aikido
Hanmi Bank, a community bank based in Los Angeles, California
Hanmi Pharmaceutical, a company based in Seoul, South Korea